Wang Zongfang (August 3, 1957 – September 18, 1983) and Wang Zongwei (November 16, 1954 – September 18, 1983), commonly called Er Wang or Two Wangs, were a pair of Chinese brothers and serial killers born in Shenyang, Liaoning. The Ministry of Public Security of China placed them on its most wanted list in 1983. They were killed in a shootout with the military in September 1983.

Crimes 
Wang Zongfang was a former soldier and stole a gun from a prison in 1976.  They committed their first murder on 12 February 1983, while robbing the People's Liberation Army Hospital in Shenyang and shot dead five soldiers during the Chinese New Year. Their attempt to flee took them across China. The nationwide pursuit of them lasted from February 12 to September 18, 1983.

Er Wang killed and injured police officers and soldiers, totaling nine dead and nine injured, using guns and grenades, in Hunan, Hubei, and Jiangsu. Their seven-month journey spread rumors around China and panic to China's police system.

Death 
The Wang brothers were killed by gunshots by the Armed Forces' Encirclement Troop in Guangchang, Jiangxi. Their deaths occurred during a nationwide strike-hard campaign on crime.

See also
List of serial killers by country
List of serial killers by number of victims

References

1950s births
1983 deaths
Brothers
Chinese mass murderers
Chinese serial killers
Criminal duos
Fugitives
Male serial killers
People shot dead by law enforcement officers in China
People from Shenyang
Sibling duos